The Kikendatch Bay is a freshwater body that leads to the Gouin Reservoir, in the territory of La Tuque, in
Haute-Mauricie, in the administrative region of Mauricie, in the province of Quebec, in Canada.

This bay is mainly located in the township of Levasseur, except the entrance (west side) of the bay located in the canton of Aubin. Following the erection completed in 1948 of the Gouin Dam, the "Kikendatch Bay" became an extension of Brochu Lake located further north-west, i.e. at the extreme east of Gouin Reservoir.

Recreotourism activities are the main economic activity of the sector. Forestry comes second. A civilian seaplane base is located at the top of the Gouin Dam.

Some secondary forest roads are in use nearby for forestry and recreational tourism activities.

The surface of Kikendatch Bay is usually frozen from mid-November to the end of April, however, safe ice circulation is generally from early December to late March.

Geography

Toponymy
This hydronym identifying this bay under the specific "Kikendatch" (graph "Kirkendatch" used in the introduction of Description of surveyed townships ...

In 1832, the map of Arrowsmith (entitled British North America) identifies this post, as "mission center of Haut-Saint-Maurice" by the priest of Yamachiche, Quebec, Severin-Nicolas Dumoulin (1793–1853), first missionary, in 1837, to visit the population of Atikamekw since the voyage of the father Jacques Buteux in 1651.

In his 1806 diary, Jean-Baptiste Perrault speaks of Kikèndâche. One of his sketches indicates a lake Kikèndàtche. According to Father Georges Lemoine, this name is of Algonquin origin and means where the boiler is and designates a place on the shore where the rock is dug in the form of a boiler. Variant: Baie Martel.

The toponym "Kikendatch Bay" was formalized on December 5, 1968, by the Commission de toponymie du Québec, when it was created.

Notes and references

See also 

Bays of Quebec
La Tuque, Quebec